Octodrine (also known as Vaporpac or DMHA) is a stimulant drug whose pharmacology was studied in a dozen animal studies from the 1940s through the 1970s.  These studies found that octodrine can increase blood pressure and cardiac output in animals. The drug was previously approved for use by the FDA as an inhalant (i.e., Vaporpac and Tickle Tackle Inhaler) and in Germany as an oral agent as part of a multicomponent medication (i.e., Ambredin and Ordinal), but is no longer available.

DMHA has also been found as an adulterant in sports supplements and is sold online as a designer drug.

Related designer drugs 
 Methylhexanamine
 1,3-Dimethylbutylamine (DMBA)

References 

Drugs acting on the nervous system
Stimulants
Abandoned drugs
Alkylamines